Adam Fawer (born 1970 in New York City)  is an American novelist. Improbable, his first novel, has been translated into eighteen languages and won the 2006 International Thriller Writers Award for best first novel. His second novel, Empathy, has been published in 2008 in German, Japanese and Turkish. His third novel, Oz, has been published in 2016 in Turkish only. Unlike the first two novels, it received generally negative reviews from critics and readers.

Early life and education
Fawer holds undergraduate and master's degrees from the University of Pennsylvania and the Wharton School of the University of Pennsylvania and received an MBA from the Stanford Graduate School of Business.

Career
During his corporate career, Fawer worked for a variety of companies including Sony Music, J.P. Morgan, and most recently, About.com, where he was the chief operating officer.

Awards and honours
In 2006, Fawer won the International Thriller Writers award for Best First Novel.

Personal life
Fawer lives in New York City with his partner and two sons.

Bibliography
Improbable, 2005 
Gnosis, also published as Empathy, 2008 
Oz, 2016

See also

 Laplace's demon

References

External links
 Official Website for Adam Fawer
 A review of Improbable by Judi Clark
 Adam Fawer's backstory for IMPROBABLE

1970 births
Living people
21st-century American novelists
University of Pennsylvania alumni
Writers from New York City
Stanford Graduate School of Business alumni
American science fiction writers
American chief operating officers
American male novelists
21st-century American male writers
Wharton School of the University of Pennsylvania alumni
Novelists from New York (state)